Ramona Hacks (born 2 November 1994) is a German female badminton player.

Achievements

BWF International Challenge/Series

Women's Doubles

 BWF International Challenge tournament
 BWF International Series tournament
 BWF Future Series tournament

References

External links 

1994 births
Living people
People from Gladbeck
Sportspeople from Münster (region)
German female badminton players